Narcélio Sobreira Limaverde (8 August 1931 – 26 January 2022) was a Brazilian politician and radiologist. A member of the Brazilian Democratic Movement, he served in the Legislative Assembly of Ceará from 1987 to 1990. He died in Fortaleza on 26 January 2022, at the age of 90.

References

1931 births
2022 deaths
Brazilian radiologists
20th-century Brazilian politicians
Brazilian Democratic Movement politicians
Members of the Legislative Assembly of Ceará
People from Fortaleza